Andrea Bacchetti may refer to:

 Andrea Bacchetti (musician) (born 1977), Italian pianist
 Andrea Bacchetti (rugby union) (born 1988), Italian rugby union player